Mary Teichman (born 1954) is an American artist and printmaker known for her color aquatint etchings.

Biography 
Mary Teichman studied printmaking, painting and drawing at The Cooper Union for the Advancement of Science and Art, graduating in 1976. Among her notable instructors were Charles Klabunde, Armando Morales and  Stephano Cusumano. While in college, she worked as an apprentice for Klabunde in his West Village etching studio, learning first-hand the tools of the trade. During her subsequent years in New York City, she spent several years at Bob Blackburn's Printmaking Workshop on 17th Street, honing her technique and style. While there she also served as a master printer and platemaker for other artists, including the painters Medrie MacPhee and Nell Blaine. She later established her own etching studio at 41 Union Square. 

Teichman's work has been shown in more than 250 invitational and juried exhibitions, and is in the permanent collections of museums, libraries and archives across the US and the world. She is a long-time member of the Boston Printmakers, as well as the Society of American Graphic Artists, which conferred a Lifetime Achievement Award upon her in 2019. In 1992, The Print Club of Albany selected her as its "Presentation Print" artist, commissioning her to produce an edition of prints for their members, and in 2018 and 2020, she was chosen as a finalist for the Rene Carcan International Prize for Printmaking, exhibiting her work in Brussels. In 2015, the Curator of Prints and Photographs at the Boston Athenaeum commissioned her to produce a special edition print for their  permanent collection. Teichman has also created original etchings for three children's books published by Harper/Collins: Stars for Sarah, by Ann Turner; Color by Christina Rossetti; and Merry Christmas, A Victorian Verse.

Collections 
The Brooklyn Museum, Brooklyn, NY

The Boston Athenæum, Boston, MA

THE MUSEUM OF THE CITY OF NEW YORK, New York, NY

THE NEW YORK PUBLIC LIBRARY PRINT COLLECTION, New York, NY

THE MUSEUM OF ART, CARNEGIE INSTITUTE, Pittsburgh, PA

THE BOSTON PUBLIC LIBRARY, Boston, MA

THE NEWARK PUBLIC LIBRARY, Newark NJ

THE MUSEUM OF ART AND ARCHEOLOGY, Columbia, MO

SYRACUSE UNIVERSITY ART MUSEUM, Syracuse, NY

BINGHAMTON UNIVERSITY ART MUSEUM, Binghamton, NY

Selected Exhibitions 
2021:  PRINT INTERNATIONAL TY PAWB, Wrexham, Wales, UK

2020:  RENE CARCAN INTERNATIONAL PRIZE FOR PRINTMAKING EXHIBIT, Bibliotheca Wittockiana, Brussels, Belgium

2019:  NATIONAL ORIGINAL PRINT EXHIBITION, Royal Society of Painter Printmakers, Bankside Gallery, London

2018:  RENE CARCAN INTERNATIONAL PRIZE FOR PRINTMAKING EXHIBIT, Bibliotheca Wittockiana, Brussels, Belgium

2017:  NEW ENGLAND ON PAPER, The Boston Athenaeum, Boston, MA

2014:  BOSTON PRINTMAKERS SMALL PRINT SHOW, The Print Centre, University of Alberta, Edmonton, Canada

2008:  TAIWAN INTERNATIONAL INVITATIONAL MINI PRINTS, Taiwan Normal University, Taipei, Taiwan

2006:  THE SOCIETY OF AMERICAN GRAPHIC ARTISTS, Hollar Studio Gallery, Prague, Czech Republic

2006:  52 ARTISTS FROM NEW YORK, The Graphic Studio Gallery, Dublin, Ireland

1996:  THE NATIONAL ACADEMY OF DESIGN ANNUAL EXHIBITION, New York, NY

1994: "RECENT ACQUISITIONS, PRESENTS OF THE PAST," The Museum of the City of New York, New York, NY

1986:  THE NATIONAL ACADEMY OF DESIGN ANNUAL EXHIBITION, New York, NY

1986 to present: THE SOCIETY OF AMERICAN GRAPHIC ARTISTS ANNUAL MEMBER EXHIBIT, New York, NY

1984:  PRINTS FROM THE NEW YORK PRINTMAKING WORKSHOP, Harward Salon, Taipei

1982 to present: THE BOSTON PRINTMAKERS ANNUAL MEMBER EXHIBIT, Boston, MA

1981:  THE BROOKLYN MUSEUM "100 New Acquisitions," Brooklyn, NY

1981:  THE NATIONAL ACADEMY OF DESIGN ANNUAL EXHIBITION, New York, NY

Solo Exhibitions 
2019:    CROSSINGS AND TRANSPOSITIONS, Guangzhou Fine Art Academy Museum, Guangzhou, China

2015:    ARGOS GALLERY, Santa Fe, NM

2014:   THE OLD PRINT SHOP, New York, NY

2005:   THE OLD PRINT SHOP, New York, NY

1991:   A CLEAN, WELL-LIGHTED PLACE, New York, NY

1991:   FITZGERALD FINE ARTS, Alexandria, VA

1990:   NEW ROCHELLE PUBLIC LIBRARY, New Rochelle, NY

1989:   WOMEN ARTISTS SERIES, Douglas College, Rutgers University, New Brunswick, NJ

1987:   UNIVERSITY OF MINNESOTA, Morris, MN

1987:   ERNESTO MAYANS GALLERY, Santa Fe, NM

1985:   ERNESTO MAYANS GALLERY, Santa Fe, NM

1982:   GAGE GALLERY, Washington, DC

1982:   A CLEAN, WELL-LIGHTED PLACE, New York, NY

1982:   THE ASSOCIATED AMERICAN ARTISTS GALLERY NEW TALENT IN PRINTMAKING EXHIBIT, New York, NY and Philadelphia, PA

Awards 

THE SOCIETY OF AMERICAN GRAPHIC ARTISTS ANNUAL AWARD FOR OUTSTANDING COMMITMENT AND CONTRIBUTIONS TO THE WORLD OF FINE ART PRINTMAKING, New York, NY, 2019

The ARUN BOSE MEMORIAL AWARD IN INTAGLIO PRINTMAKING, The Society of American Graphic Artists 85th Members Print Exhibition 2019, New Public Library Special Collections, Newark, NJ, 2019

THE KATHY CARACCIO PURCHASE PRIZE, Prints for the New Century, The Society of American Graphic Artists 84th Members Print Exhibition, Syracuse University Art Galleries, Syracuse, NY, 2018

THE RINGHOLZ FOUNDATION VISUAL ARTS GRANT, 2016

MARY AND JOHN VOLLMAN SPONSORSHIP, Delta National Small Prints Exhibition 2016, Bradbury Art Museum, Jonesboro, AK, 2016

RECOGNITION FOR EXCELLENCE, First National Exhibition of Intaglio Prints, The New York Society of Etchers, The National Arts Club, New York, NY

JOHN ROSS AWARD, The Society of American Graphic Artists 70th National Member's Exhibition, Susan Teller Gallery, New York, NY, 2004

K. CARACCIO COLOR INTAGLIO PURCHASE AWARD, The Society of American Graphic Artists 69th National Exhibition, The Art Student's League, New York, NY, 2002

ANNE STELE MARCH MEMORIAL AWARD, Pen and Brush 2002 Annual Graphics Exhibition, New York, NY, 2002

ADELA LINTELMANN MEMORIAL AWARD, Pen and Brush Small Works Exhibition, New York, NY, 2001

ELIZABETH FENN MEMORIAL AWARD, Pen and Brush Graphics and Watercolor Exhibition, New York, NY, 2001

K. CARACCIO COLOR INTAGLIO AWARD, The Society of American Graphic Artists 68th National Exhibition, New York, NY, 2000

JUROR'S COMMENDATION, The Boston Printmakers 24th Annual Member's Exhibition, Duxbury, MA, 1997

SECOND PRIZE, Second Annual International Exhibition of Small Works on Paper, 1995

JUROR'S COMMENDATION, The Boston Printmakers 44th North American Print Exhibition, 1993

PRESENTATION PRINT ARTIST FOR 1993, The Print Club of Albany

EVA HOUSTON WEAVER PURCHASE AWARD, Print Club of Albany 17th National Open Print Exhibition, 1992

BOSTON PRINTMAKERS AWARD, Member's Exhibition, 1988

THE E. WEYHE GALLERY PURCHASE AWARD, 62nd National Print Exhibition, 1986

PURCHASE PRIZE, The Heart of America National Print Exhibition, 1986

JUROR'S CASH AWARD, Texas Realism 1985, Texas Fine Arts Association, 1985

THE OTIS PHILBROOK AWARD, 12th Annual Boston Printmaker's Member's Show, 1985

PURCHASE PRIZE, Charlotte Printmakers Society Annual Print Exhibition, 1982

JEROME FOUNDATION AWARD, 1982

SPECIAL AWARD, The Print Club of Philadelphia Annual International Competition, 1981

THE LESSING J. ROSENWALD CASH PRIZE, The Print Club of Philadelphia Annual International Competition, 1980

HONORABLE MENTION, The National Arts Club 6th Graphic Exhibition, 1979

Publications and Reviews 
THE NEW MEXICAN, "Pasatiempo Magazine, NIGHT VISION, by Michael Abatemarco, October 30, 2015

PRINTMAKING REVOLUTION, by Dwight Pogue, pp. 177, 181-3, Random House, 2012

EXPRESSIVE DRAWING, by Steven Aimone, pp. 184-5, Lark Books, 2009

THE JOURNAL OF THE PRINT WORLD,  "Art Werger and Mary Teichman Contemporary/ Artist Printmakers", Volume 28, #1, Winter 2005

THE ART AND CRAFT OF HAND LETTERING, by Annie Cicale, Lark Books, 2004

MERRY CHRISTMAS, a Victorian Verse, by Mary Teichman, HarperCollins, 1993

COLOR, Poem by Christina Rossetti, etchings by Mary Teichman, HarperCollins, 1992

STARS FOR SARAH, by Ann Turner, etchings by Mary Teichman, HarperCollins, 1991

THE NEW YORK TIMES, "A Show Full of Eye Catchers" by William Zimmer, August 21, 1988

THE NEW MEXICAN, "Pasatiempo Magazine, Visual Arts", by Nicole Plett, July 19, 1985

AMERICAN ARTISTS MAGAZINE, Emerging Artists, by Robin Longman, Vol. 48, Issue 505, pp. 34-5, August, 1984

THE NEW YORK TIMES,  "In the Arts: Critic's Choices", Sunday, June 27, 1982

THE JOURNAL OF THE PRINT WORLD, "Presentation Print, Mary Teichman, The Print Club of Albany", Volume 16, #3, Summer 1993

22ND NATIONAL PRINTMAKING EXHIBITION/ THE BROOKLYN MUSEUM, p. 84, 1981

THE PRINTWORLD DIRECTORY

References

External Links 
Mary Teichman website

1954 births
Living people